Windber Historic District is a national historic district located at Paint Borough, Scalp Level, and Windber in Cambria County and Somerset County, Pennsylvania. The district includes 944 contributing buildings and 1 contributing site. It encompasses an area first developed by the Berwind-White Coal Company in 1897, and developed and between 1897 and 1930.  It includes the central business district of Windber and surrounding residential areas, consisting largely of workers' housing.  Notable buildings include the Berwind-White Headquarters Building (1903), Eureka Department Store (1899), Windber Trust Company (1910), Windber Electric Building (1925), Clement Building (1902), Windber Hotel (1902), former train station (1916), Arcadia Theater (1919), Clubhouse (1899), David Shaffer House (now Windber Museum, 1886), and Windber Hospital (c. 1905).

It was listed on the National Register of Historic Places in 1991.

References

External links
 Town of Windber, Windber, Somerset County, PA: 3 photos, 56 data pages, and 1 photo caption page, at Historic American Engineering Record
 Berwind-White Coal Mining Company, Main Office, Fifteenth Street & Somerset Avenue, Windber, Somerset County, PA: 1 photo and 1 photo caption page, at Historic American Engineering Record
 Windber Post Office, Fifteenth Street & Graham Avenue, Windber, Somerset County, PA: 1 photo and 1 photo caption page, at Historic American Engineering Record
 Windber Electric Building, 509 Fifteenth Street, Windber, Somerset County, PA: 1 photo and 1 photo caption page, at Historic American Engineering Record
 Eureka Department Store, Fifteenth Street & Somerset Avenue, Windber, Somerset County, PA: 1 photo and 1 photo caption page, at Historic American Engineering Record
 Arcadia Theater, Graham Avenue, Windber, Somerset County, PA: 1 photo and 1 photo caption page, at Historic American Engineering Record
 Berwind-White Coal Mining Company, House, 510 Twentieth Street, Windber, Somerset County, PA: 1 photo and 1 photo caption page, at Historic American Engineering Record
 Eureka Supply Company Store No. 32, Twenty-first Street & Graham Avenue, Windber, Somerset County, PA: 1 photo and 1 photo caption page, at Historic American Engineering Record
 Eureka Supply Company Store No. 31, Tenth Street, Windber, Somerset County, PA: 1 photo and 1 photo caption page, at Historic American Engineering Record
 Clement Building, 506 Fifteenth Street, Windber, Somerset County, PA: 1 photo and 1 photo caption page, at Historic American Engineering Record

Historic districts on the National Register of Historic Places in Pennsylvania
Colonial Revival architecture in Pennsylvania
Queen Anne architecture in Pennsylvania
Historic districts in Cambria County, Pennsylvania
Historic districts in Somerset County, Pennsylvania
National Register of Historic Places in Cambria County, Pennsylvania
National Register of Historic Places in Somerset County, Pennsylvania